The Assault (French: L'assaut) is a 1936 French drama film directed by Pierre-Jean Ducis and starring Charles Vanel, Alice Field and Madeleine Robinson. It is based on the 1912 play of the same title by Henri Bernstein.

It was shot at the Joinville Studios of Paramount Pictures in Paris. Location shooting took place at the National Assembly and in Blois. The film's sets were designed by the art directors Jacques-Laurent Atthalin and Henri Ménessier.

Synopsis
The leader of a political party running for high office is challenged by a rival about a theft he has committed in the past.

Cast
 Charles Vanel as Alexandre Mérital
 Alice Field as Renée de Rould
 André Alerme as Frépeau 
 Madeleine Robinson as Georgette Mérital
 Charles Lemontier as Garancier
 Jean Joffre as Marc Label
 Philippe Janvier as Julien Mérital
 Marcel Vergne as Daniel Mérital 
 Marcel Chabrier as Le préfet 
 Arlette Dubreuil as Hélène
 Janine Darcey as La bonne 
 Maurice Marceau as 	Un journaliste 
 Maurice Schutz as Joseph, le majordome de Mérital

References

Bibliography 
 Goble, Alan. The Complete Index to Literary Sources in Film. Walter de Gruyter, 1999.

External links 
 

1936 films
French drama films
French black-and-white films
1936 drama films
1930s French-language films
Films directed by Pierre-Jean Ducis
French films based on plays
Paramount Pictures films
Films shot at Joinville Studios
1930s French films